Sofía Usandizaga (born 1 November 1970) is an Argentine sailor. She competed in the women's 470 event at the 1996 Summer Olympics.

References

External links
 

1970 births
Living people
Argentine female sailors (sport)
Olympic sailors of Argentina
Sailors at the 1996 Summer Olympics – 470
Sportspeople from Bariloche